Lieutenant-Colonel Frank Edward Bourne OBE DCM (27 April 1855 – 9 May 1945) was a decorated British soldier who participated in the defence of Rorke's Drift during the 1879 Anglo-Zulu War.

Early life
Born in Balcombe, Sussex, England on 27 April 1855 to James and Harriett (Gaston) Bourne. He was the youngest of eight children with five brothers and two sisters. Bourne enlisted in the Army at Reigate on 18 December 1872. Four years later he had been promoted to colour sergeant, becoming the youngest NCO of this rank in the entire British Army. This earned him the nickname 'The Kid'.

Rorke's Drift
On 22 and 23 January 1879, Bourne was part of the garrison at Rorke's Drift, Natal, South Africa, which held off a Zulu army. 
Bourne, who was now an NCO in B Company, 2nd Battalion, 24th (2nd Warwickshire) Regiment of Foot, helped organise the defence at the mission station and field hospital. Throughout the day and night of the battle, the Zulus made repeated attacks against the barricades, but the outnumbered defenders held out until relief arrived.
 
For his bravery, Bourne received the Distinguished Conduct Medal (DCM) for "outstanding coolness and courage" during the battle, with a £10 annuity. The DCM, until 1993, was the second highest military decoration (after the Victoria Cross) awarded to other ranks of the British Army. He was offered a commission, but "being an eighth son, and the family exchequer ... empty", he declined it.

Later career
After Rorke's Drift, Frank Bourne served in British India and Burma, being promoted to Quartermaster-Sergeant in 1884. He was commissioned in 1890. In 1893 he was appointed adjutant of the School of Musketry at Hythe, Kent, retiring from the army in 1907. During World War I, he rejoined and served as adjutant of the School of Musketry in Dublin. At the end of the war, he was given the honorary rank of lieutenant colonel and appointed OBE. He retired for the 2nd time in 1919, at the age of 64.

Bourne lived in retirement at 16 King's Hall Road, Beckenham, Kent. He was the last surviving defender from Rorke's Drift, dying on 9 May 1945 (the day after VE Day), at the age of 90. Bourne was buried in Beckenham Crematorium and Cemetery. His house in Beckenham has been adorned with a blue plaque.

Film portrayal
In the 1964 film Zulu, Bourne was played by Nigel Green. Green was considerably older (about 40 years old) and taller than Bourne, who was 23 at the time of the battle and 5' 6" (1.68 m).

References

External links
www.rorkesdriftvc.com, (2459 B Co. 24th. Regiment) (biography, photos, memorial details)
Transcript of radio interview with Colour Sergeant Bourne recorded in 1936
Rorke's Drift Details at www.victoriacross.co.uk listing of medal recipients, casualties

1854 births
1945 deaths
Recipients of the Distinguished Conduct Medal
Officers of the Order of the British Empire
South Wales Borderers soldiers
South Wales Borderers officers
People from Balcombe, West Sussex
British Army personnel of the Anglo-Zulu War
British Army personnel of World War I